This list of Ports and harbours in Mozambique details the ports, harbours around the coast of Mozambique.

List of ports and harbours in Mozambique

External links

References

Ports

Mozambique